Bharat Milap is a Bollywood film. It was released in 1942. based on Ramayana.

Remakes
It was remade into two movies in the same year 1965, by Babubhai Mistry starring Sohrab Modi, Sulochana, Ashish Kumar. And as Shree Ram Bharat Milan in Color by Manibhai Vyas, starring Prithviraj Kapoor, Mahipal, Anita Guha, Nirupa Roy, Raj Kumar, and Sulochana.

References

External links
 
 Bharat Milap (1942) on indiancine.ma

1942 films
1940s Hindi-language films
Films directed by Vijay Bhatt
Films based on the Ramayana
Indian black-and-white films